Ouad Naga is a town and urban commune in the Trarza Region of south-western Mauritania.

In 2000 it had a population of 10,291.

References

Communes of Trarza Region